Héber Alberto Arriola (born 14 August 1980) is an Argentine football forward who plays for Boca Unidos of the Primera B Nacional in Argentina.

Career
Arriola began his playing career in 2000 with Deportivo Español in the Argentine 3rd division.

In 2001, he moved to Europe where he played for C.S. Marítimo of Portugal and CD Badajoz of Spain.

In 2003, he returned to Argentina to play for All Boys back in the 3rd division, the following season he joined Tigre where he was a key player in the team that won the Apertura 2004 and Clausura 2005 tournaments and promotion to the 2nd division.

Arriola was then signed by Paraguayan Primera División side Nacional in 2005, he joined Olimpia in 2006 but returned to Nacional in 2007. He was part of the squad that won the 2009 Clausura tournament.

In 2010, he joined Universidad San Martín of the Peruvian Primera División and is the top scorer in the league with only one game left of the season.

Titles
Tigre
 Primera B Metropolitana: Apertura 2004, Clausura 2005
Nacional
 Paraguayan Primera Division: Clausura 2009

External links
 
 

1980 births
Living people
Footballers from Buenos Aires
Association football forwards
Deportivo Español footballers
All Boys footballers
Club Atlético Tigre footballers
CD Badajoz players
Club Nacional footballers
Club Olimpia footballers
Club Deportivo Universidad de San Martín de Porres players
C.S. Marítimo players
Paraguayan Primera División players
Peruvian Primera División players
Argentine expatriate sportspeople in Spain
Argentine expatriate footballers
Argentine footballers
Expatriate footballers in Portugal
Expatriate footballers in Spain
Expatriate footballers in Paraguay
Expatriate footballers in Peru